Nicos may refer to:

Nicos Anastasiades (born 1946), Cypriot politician and leader of the right wing political party DISY
Nicos Jiapouras (born 1970), Cypriot International footballer
Nicos Nicolaides, Greek painter and writer
Nicos Panayiotou (born 1970), former international Cypriot football goalkeeper
Nicos Poulantzas (1936–1979), Greco-French Marxist political sociologist

See also 
Nico (given name)
Nikos